Dansbandskampen is a television show established by Peter Settman and his production company Baluba. Peter Settman is also the show host. The show is broadcast over Sveriges Television, with season 1 airing October–December 2008.

In 2008, five bands participated each week. Each week consisted of one moment where the bands were free to perform a pop or rock song, followed up by the second moment, Dansbandsklassikern ("The dansband classic"), where a famous dansband song was performed, chosen by drawing. The finalist bands are given an own, new own-produced song, followed up by the two remaining bands performing their own version of a song.

There are discussions of spreading the concept outside Sweden, with a disco/folk music version in Poland and a country music version in the United States.

Seasons

Season 1 
2008, Larz-Kristerz winners with Scotts as runner-up.

Season 2 
2009, The Playtones winners with Titanix as runner-up.

Season 3 
2010, Elisa's winners before Willez and CC & Lee.

See also 
Dansbandslåten

External links 

Sveriges bästa dansband
Sveriges Television

References 

Recurring events established in 2008
Dansband music
Sveriges Television original programming
2000s in Swedish music
2010s in Swedish music